The First Bite is the first extended play by American recording artist Cara Cunningham, released on March 19, 2011. The extended play consists of two singles and three unreleased songs. The album includes the singles "Freak of Nature" which was released on November 30, 2010 and "I Want Your Bite" on February 14, 2011.

Track listing

Personnel
 Cara Cunningham – vocals

References

External links
Official website
Official Facebook

2011 debut EPs
Chris Crocker albums
Self-released EPs